Kevin Melville Coote (29 April 1931 – 8 May 2013) was an Australian wrestler. He competed at the 1952 Summer Olympics and the 1956 Summer Olympics.

References

External links
 

1931 births
2013 deaths
Australian male sport wrestlers
Olympic wrestlers of Australia
Wrestlers at the 1952 Summer Olympics
Wrestlers at the 1956 Summer Olympics
Sportspeople from Melbourne
Sportsmen from Victoria (Australia)
People from Parkdale, Victoria